Barakaldo is a station on line 2 of the Bilbao metro. It is located in central Barakaldo, in close proximity to the city hall, the municipal courthouse and the Escuela Oficial de Idiomas. It opened on 13 April 2002.

Station layout 

Barakaldo station follows the typical cavern-shaped layout of most underground Metro Bilbao stations designed by Norman Foster, with the main hall located directly above the rail tracks.

Access 

  18 Los Fueros St. (Fueros exit)
  1 Euskadi Av. (Corthouse) (Avda. Euskadi exit)
  21 Elkano St. (Elkano exit)
   2 De la Libertad Av.

Services 
The station is served by line 2 from Basauri to Kabiezes. The station is also served by Bizkaibus regional bus services and Kbus, the municipal bus service.

References

External links
 

Line 2 (Bilbao metro) stations
Railway stations in Spain opened in 2002
2002 establishments in the Basque Country (autonomous community)
Barakaldo